The Garden of Eden is a 1984 American short documentary film directed by Roger M. Sherman. It was nominated for an Academy Award for Best Documentary Short.

References

External links
The Garden of Eden at Direct Cinema Limited

1984 films
1984 short films
1984 documentary films
American short documentary films
1980s short documentary films
1980s English-language films
1980s American films